Myrceugenia fernandeziana is a species of plant in the family Myrtaceae. It is endemic to Robinson Crusoe Island in the Pacific, part of the Republic of Chile.  It is threatened by habitat loss. It is a dominant species in its habitat of lowland dry forests and lower montane forests. Its extent has declined through the effects of feral animals, introduced weeds, and soil erosion to a preliminary estimate of less than 100 km2.

References

fernandeziana
Endemic flora of the Juan Fernández Islands
Vulnerable plants
Robinson Crusoe Island
Taxonomy articles created by Polbot